Spreadborough is a suburb in the City of Mount Isa, Queensland, Australia.

Geography 
The Leichhard River flows north-south through the town of Mount Isa, dividing the suburbs of the town into "mineside" (west of the Leichhardt River) and "townside" (east of the Leichhardt River). Spreadborough is a "townside" suburb.

History 
Spreadborough was named on 1 September 1973 by the Queensland Place Names Board after the family who owned the land. On 16 March 2001 the status of Spreadborough was changed from a locality to a suburb.

References 

City of Mount Isa
Suburbs in Queensland